Alwyn Curnick (8 April 1928 – 16 April 1960) was a South African cricketer. He played in twelve first-class matches from 1946/47 to 1950/51.

References

External links
 

1928 births
1960 deaths
South African cricketers
Border cricketers
Eastern Province cricketers
People from Ngcobo
Cricketers from the Eastern Cape